The Great Gobi A Strictly Protected Area is a nature reserve in the Gobi Desert, situated in the southwestern part of Mongolia at the border with China. A similar reserve in the Gobi exists farther to the west - the Great Gobi B Strictly Protected Area. Great Gobi A is one of the last refuges for critically endangered animals such as the wild Bactrian camel and the Gobi bear.

Location and size
Great Gobi A lies in the southwestern part of Mongolia in an arid region of the Gobi desert. The vegetation is dominated by desert and desert steppe. With a total area of about  it is one of the largest reserves worldwide.

Climate
The Climate is extremely "continental". With an average yearly rainfall of about {, the climate is extremely arid.

Fauna
The reserve is an important refuge for some endangered large mammal species, such as the wild Bactrian camel (Camelus ferus), which was identified as a separate species in 2008 by the Veterinary University of Vienna, the Gobi bear (Ursus arctos gobiensis), the snow leopard (Uncia uncia), the argali wild sheep (Ovis ammon) and the Mongolian wild ass (Equus hemionus hemionus). Especially for the wild camel the reserve is important, since it is one of three last locations, where the rare animal can be found. Due to the remoteness and large size of the reserve, it is hard to estimate population numbers or population trends. Estimates for the population of wild camels in the reserve range from about 350 to 1950 individuals. Wolves (Canis lupus), which are also found in the reserve, might be a threat for the calves of wild camels. However, the effects of these predators on the camel population are unclear.

Twenty km from the reserve is the wild camel breeding centre at Zakhyn Us, which was established in 2004 with 12 wild camels which had been caught by Mongolian herdsmen. There were 22 wild camels at the breeding centre in 2014  and in 2013 two bull wild camels were released into the reserve with satellite collars. One of them has formed his own herd with five female wild camels. The breeding centre which is financed by the Wild Camel Protection Foundation and administered by the Director of Gobi "A" covers {. In 2008 the Veterinary University of Vienna confirmed after extensive DNA testing that the wild camel is a new and separate species which separated from any other known camel species over 750,000 years ago.

References

Protected areas of Mongolia
Gobi Desert
Nature reserves